Stewart Armstrong Copeland (born July 16, 1952) is a Scottish-American musician and composer. He is best known for his work as the drummer of the English rock band the Police from 1977 to 1986, and again from 2007 to 2008. Before playing with the Police, he played drums with English rock band Curved Air from 1975 to 1976. As a composer, his work includes the films Wall Street (1987), Men At Work (1990), Good Burger (1997), and We Are Your Friends (2015); the television shows The Equalizer (1985–1989), The Amanda Show (1999–2002), and Dead Like Me (2003–2004); and video games such as the Spyro series (1998–present) and Alone in the Dark: The New Nightmare (2001). He has also written various pieces of ballet, opera, and orchestral music.

According to MusicRadar, Copeland's "distinctive drum sound and uniqueness of style has made him one of the most popular drummers to ever get behind a drumset". He was ranked the 10th best drummer of all time by Rolling Stone in 2016. He was inducted into the Rock and Roll Hall of Fame as a member of the Police in 2003, the Modern Drummer Hall of Fame in 2005, and the Classic Drummer Hall of Fame in 2013.

Early life
Stewart Armstrong Copeland was born in Alexandria, Virginia, on July 16, 1952, the youngest of four children of Scottish archaeologist Lorraine Copeland (née Adie; 1921–2013) and American CIA officer Miles Copeland Jr. (1916–1991). His mother was born in Edinburgh, while his father was from Alabama. His father was, according to his own 1989 biography and files released by the CIA in 2008, a founding member of the OSS and the CIA. The family moved to Cairo a few months after Copeland's birth. When he was five years old, the family moved to Beirut, where he attended the American Community School. He started taking drum lessons at age 12 and was playing drums for school dances within a year. He later moved to England, attending the American School in London and Millfield boarding school in Somerset from 1967 to 1969. He went to college in California, enrolling at Alliant International University and the University of California, Berkeley. His eldest brother, Miles Copeland III (born 1944), founded I.R.S. Records and became the Police's manager. He has also overseen Copeland's interests in other music projects. His other brother, Ian Copeland (1949–2006), was a pioneering booking agent who represented the Police and many others.

Career

Curved Air (1975–1976)
Returning to England, Copeland worked as road manager for the progressive rock band Curved Air's 1974 reunion tour, and then as drummer for the band during 1975 and 1976. The band kicked off with a European tour, which started poorly. Band leader Darryl Way, a notorious perfectionist, grew impatient with the struggling of his bandmates, especially novice drummer Copeland. Then, for reasons no one could pinpoint, the musicians suddenly "clicked" with each other and the band caught fire, quickly becoming a popular and acclaimed live act.

However, Curved Air has still been doing concerts in 2022, with its original singer Sonja Kristina, so although members change, the band cannot be classified as broken up. Live recent concerts from Curved Air such as this one in Rio de Janeiro, can be found on YouTube.

The Police (1977–1986)

In early 1977, Copeland founded the Police with lead singer-bass guitarist Sting and guitarist Henry Padovani (who was soon replaced by Andy Summers), and they became one of the top bands of the late 1970s and early 1980s. Copeland was the youngest member of the band. The Police's early track list (before their album debut) was largely Copeland compositions, including the band's first single "Fall Out" (Illegal Records, 1977) and the B-side "Nothing Achieving". Though Copeland's songwriting contribution was reduced to a couple of songs per album as Sting started writing more material, he continued to co-arrange all the Police's songs together with his two bandmates. Amongst Copeland's most notable songs are "On Any Other Day" (where he also sang lead vocals), "Does Everyone Stare" (later to be used as the title of his documentary on the band Everyone Stares: The Police Inside Out), "Contact", "Bombs Away", "Darkness" and "Miss Gradenko". Copeland also co-wrote a number of songs with Sting, including "Peanuts", "Landlord", "It's Alright for You" and "Re-Humanize Yourself".

Copeland also recorded under the pseudonym Klark Kent, releasing several UK singles in 1978 with one ("Don't Care") entering the UK Singles Chart that year, along with an eponymous 10-inch album on green vinyl released in 1980. Recording at Nigel Gray's Surrey Sound Studios, Copeland played all the instruments and sang the lead vocals himself. Kent's "Don't Care", which peaked at No. 48 UK in August 1978, actually predates the first chart single by the Police by several months ("Can't Stand Losing You", issued in October 1978) as "Don't Care" was released in early June 1978.

In 1982, Copeland was involved in the production of a WOMAD benefit album called Music and Rhythm. Copeland's score for Rumble Fish secured him a Golden Globe nomination in 1983. The film, directed and produced by Francis Ford Coppola from the S. E. Hinton novel, also had a song released to radio on A&M Records "Don't Box Me In" (UK Singles Chart n. 91)—a collaboration between Copeland and singer-songwriter Stan Ridgway, leader of the band Wall of Voodoo—that received significant airplay upon release of the film that year.

The Rhythmatist record of 1985 was the result of a pilgrimage to Africa and its people, and it features local drums and percussion, with more drums, percussion, other musical instruments and occasional lead vocals added by Copeland. The album was the official soundtrack to the movie of the same name, which was co-written by Stewart. Copeland is seen in the film playing the drums in a cage with lions surrounding him.
The band attempted a reunion in 1986, but the project fell apart.

Solo projects and movie soundtracks (1987–1998)

After the Police disbanded, Copeland established a career composing soundtracks for movies (Airborne, Talk Radio, Wall Street, Riff Raff, Raining Stones, Surviving the Game, See No Evil, Hear No Evil, Highlander II: The Quickening, She's Having a Baby, The First Power, Fresh, Taking Care of Business, West Beirut, I am David, Riding the Bus with My Sister, Good Burger), television (The Equalizer, Dead Like Me, Star Wars: Droids, the pilot for Babylon 5 (1993), Nickelodeon's The Amanda Show, The Life and Times of Juniper Lee), operas (Holy Blood and Crescent Moon, commissioned by Cleveland Opera) and ballets (Prey' Ballet Oklahoma, Casque of Amontillado, Noah's Ark/Solcheeka, commissioned by the Seattle Symphony Orchestra, King Lear, commissioned by the San Francisco Ballet Company, Emilio). In 1996, Copeland provided the score for The Leopard Son, Discovery Channel's its first commercially released full-length feature film, made by wildlife filmmaker Hugo van Lawick.

Copeland also occasionally played drums for other artists. Peter Gabriel employed Copeland to perform on his song "Red Rain" from his 1986 album So because of his "hi-hat mastery". He has also performed with Mike Rutherford and Tom Waits. That year he also teamed with Adam Ant to record the title track and video for the Anthony Michael Hall movie Out of Bounds. In 1989, Copeland formed Animal Logic with jazz bassist Stanley Clarke and singer-songwriter Deborah Holland. The trio had success with their first album and world tour but the follow-up recording sold poorly, and the band did not continue.

In 1993 he composed the music for Channel 4's Horse Opera and director Bob Baldwin, and in 1999, he provided the voice of an additional American soldier in the animated musical comedy war film South Park: Bigger, Longer & Uncut (1999).

Spyro the Dragon soundtracks (1998–2002, 2018)

He was commissioned by Insomniac Games in 1998 to make the musical score for the hit PlayStation game Spyro the Dragon. Copeland would play through the levels first to get a feel for each one before composing the soundtrack. He also stayed with the project to create the musical scores for the remaining Insomniac sequels Spyro 2: Ripto's Rage! and Spyro: Year of the Dragon. The franchise shifted over to Universal for the fourth title, Spyro: Enter the Dragonfly, which would be Copeland's last outing with the series. While the soundtracks never saw commercial release, the limited edition of the fourth game came packaged with a bonus CD, containing unused tracks. The soundtracks were very well received, and one track would later appear on the 2007 compilation album The Stewart Copeland Anthology. Copeland composed a new title theme for Spyro Reignited Trilogy.

This period also saw Copeland compose the soundtrack for Alone in the Dark: The New Nightmare, his only video game soundtrack outside of the Spyro franchise to date. In 2000, he combined with Les Claypool of Primus (with whom he produced a track on the Primus album Antipop) and Trey Anastasio of Phish to create the band Oysterhead. That same year, he was approached by director Adam Collis to assemble the score for the film Sunset Strip.

Collaborations (2002–2006)

In 2002, Copeland was hired by Ray Manzarek and Robby Krieger of the Doors to play with them for a new album and tour, but the tour was cut short because of a band rule that the band logo: “The Doors” not be used by any band members who are not the original members of the band.

As the Billboard article from March 2003, states:

Former Police drummer Stewart Copeland has filed $1 million breach of oral contract suit against two surviving members of the Doors, Ray Manzarek and Robbie Krieger. In the suit — filed last week in Los Angeles Superior Court — Copeland alleges that in February he was dismissed without cause as drummer from The Doors 21st Century, a revival act that since last year has been performing Doors material and features keyboardist Manzarek, guitarist Krieger, and Ian Astbury (formerly of the Cult) on vocals.

The suit says that Copeland, who was to receive “20% of the net profits” from touring and an as-yet-unreleased album, was paid his share through January, but his abrupt dismissal has caused him to lose more than $1 million.

Copeland’s action comes just weeks after original Doors drummer John Densmore filed his own suit against the refurbished Doors. As previously reported Densmore filed a multiple-count lawsuit against Manzarek and Krieger, among others, claiming that written and oral agreements mandate that the Doors name and logo can be used only by the complete original band. The drummer (Densmore) reportedly opted out of the new group due to his battle with the hearing disorder tinnitus. 

In 2005, Copeland released "Orchestralli", a live recording of chamber ensemble music which he had composed during a short tour of Italy in 2002.  Also in 2005, Copeland started Gizmodrome, a new project with avant-garde guitarist David Fiuczynski, multi-instrumentalist Vittorio Cosma, singer Raiz and bassist Max Gazzè. The band made their U.S debut on September 16, 2006, at the Modern Drummer Drum Festival. In January 2006, Copeland premiered his film about the Police called Everyone Stares: The Police Inside Out at the Sundance Film Festival. In February and March, he appeared as one of the judges on the BBC television show Just the Two of Us (a role he later reprised for a second series in January 2007).

The Police reunion (2007–2008) 

At the 2007 Grammy Awards, Copeland, Andy Summers and Sting performed the song "Roxanne" together again as the Police. This marked the band's first public performance since 1986 (they had previously reunited only for an improvised set at Sting's wedding party in 1992 and for their induction into the Rock and Roll Hall of Fame in 2003). One day later, the band announced that in celebration of the Police's 30th anniversary, they would be embarking on what turned out to be a one-off reunion tour on May 28, 2007. During the tour, Copeland also released his compilation album The Stewart Copeland Anthology, which was composed of his independent work.

In 2007, the French government appointed Copeland (along with Police bandmates Summers and Sting) a Chevalier of the Ordre des Arts et des Lettres.

The group performed 151 dates across five continents, concluding with a final show in August 2008 at Madison Square Garden, New York.

Projects (2008–present) 

In 2008, RIM commissioned Copeland to write a "soundtrack" for the BlackBerry Bold smart phone. He created a highly percussive theme of one minute's length from which he evolved six ringtones and a softer 'alarm tone' that are preloaded on the device.

In March 2008, he premiered his orchestral composition "Celeste" at "An Evening with Stewart Copeland", part of the Savannah Music Festival. The performance featured classical violinist Daniel Hope. His appearance at Savannah included a screening of Everyone Stares: The Police Inside Out and a question and answer session. Also in 2008, he was commissioned by the Dallas Symphony Orchestra to create a percussion piece involving primarily Indonesian instruments. "Gamelan D'Drum" was first performed in Dallas on February 5, 2012, and had its European Premiere at the Royal Academy of Music in London in July 2012.

On August 21, 2009, at SummerFest 2009, Copeland unveiled the composition "Retail Therapy", which was commissioned by the Music Society. He performed three more original works: "Kaya", "Celeste", and "Gene Pool", the last accompanied by San Diego-based percussion ensemble red fish blue fish. He attended a composer's roundtable and a question and answer discussion in conjunction with the festival. Copeland wrote the score for a theatrical presentation of Ben-Hur, which premiered on September 17, 2009, at the O2 Arena in London. He provided English-language narration of the production, which is performed in Latin and Aramaic. His memoir Strange Things Happen: A Life with The Police, Polo, and Pygmies was released by HarperCollins in September 2009. The book chronicles events in his life from childhood through his work with the Police and to the present. In October 2009, he was a guest on Private Passions, the biographical music discussion program on BBC Radio 3.

On May 24, 2011, he started a YouTube channel devoted to his videos and project updates. On this channel, he uploads performances with various musicians, including Primus, Andy Summers, Jeff Lynne, Snoop Dogg, and others in his home studio, which he refers to as the Sacred Grove. On August 24, 2011, he was a featured soloist on the Late Show with David Letterman, as part of their second "Drum Solo Week".

On January 10, 2012, he appeared on an episode of the A&E reality series Storage Wars to appraise a drum set for Barry Weiss, buying a Turkish cymbal from the set for $40. In July he reunited with former Animal Logic bandmate Stanley Clarke for a European tour.

In May 2013, he and the Long Beach Opera premiered The Tale Tell Heart, an opera based on the short story by Edgar Allan Poe.

On November 26, 2013, he appeared in the first episode of The Tim Ferriss Experiment.

In 2017, he formed the supergroup Gizmodrome with Adrian Belew, Vittorio Cosma, and Mark King and released an album of the same name.

Ricky Kej and Stewart Copeland had worked together on a song in 2016 and so with a pause in concerts and activity due to the pandemic, Kej reached out to Copeland to collaborate on a new album that came to be called Divine Tides. Released in 2021, the album includes nine songs and eight music videos that were shot in locations ranging from the Himalayas in India, to forests in Spain. In April 2022, the album scored Copeland his 6th Grammy Award, and Ricky Kej his second Grammy Awards, in the category of Best New Age Album.

On September 5, 2021, the opera Electric Saint about the life of Nikola Tesla by Copeland with libretto by Jonathan Moore premiered at the National Theater of Weimar.

On February 6, 2023, the album "Divine Tides" brought Copeland his 7th Grammy Award and Ricky Kej his 3rd Grammy Award in the 65th Annual Grammy Awards in the category of Best Immersive Audio Album.

Personal life
In 1974, Copeland became romantically involved with Curved Air vocalist Sonja Kristina, and they were married from 1982 to 1991. He adopted her son from a previous relationship, and they had two sons of their own. In 1981, he fathered a son with Irish author Desmond Guinness' daughter Marina. He currently lives in Los Angeles with his second wife, with whom he has three children.

Copeland's hobbies include rollerskating, cycling along the beach in Santa Monica, filmmaking, and playing polo. He is also active on his YouTube channel, where he uploads videos of himself and other musicians during jam sessions in his studio, the Sacred Grove.

Drumming style
Copeland grew up listening to a combination of Lebanese music, rock and roll, jazz, and reggae, but he selected from these styles what he needed rather than imitating them. In the 1980s, when many musicians were looking for bigger sound from bigger drums, he added Octobans. Invented by Tama Drums in 1978, Octobans consisted of eight six-inch drums in the shape of narrow tubes. He used another innovation, a splash cymbal based on a toy that he owned and that he helped Paiste design. He relied heavily on his 13" hi-hats.

Despite being left-handed, Copeland plays a right-handed drum kit, placing the hi-hats on his left and ride cymbal and floor toms on his right. He uses a wide dynamic range and demonstrates a proficiency of jazz-style articulation in his snare drum playing, interspersing strong back-beats with soft rim comping. During his years with the Police, he became known for engaging only the hi-hat with the bass drum to keep the beat.

In an interview with Modern Drummer, Copeland has cited Mitch Mitchell of the Jimi Hendrix Experience as a prime musical influence. He states that as a child, whenever he had a song or melody pop in his head, he would walk around wondering how Mitchell would drum to that particular tune. He also named Sandy Nelson and Ginger Baker as other fundamental influences in the youth years. He has stated that due to his "enforced listening" of Buddy Rich, he considers himself "allergic" to jazz.

He is noted for his strong emphasis on the groove as a complement to the song, rather than as its core component. Nonetheless, his playing often incorporates spectacular fills and subtle inflections which greatly augment the groove. Compared to most of his 1980s contemporaries, his snare sound was bright and cutting. He is also one of the few rock drummers to use traditional grip rather than matched grip. He is also noted for syncopation in his drumming.

Equipment
Copeland's equipment includes Tama drums, Paiste cymbals, Remo drum heads, and Vater signature drum sticks.

Original live kit set-up (1984)
 Tama Imperialstar Mahogany Drums (9-ply) and Paiste Cymbals:
Drums – Midnight Blue
10x8" Rack Tom
12x8" Rack Tom
13x9" Rack Tom
16x16" Floor Tom
14x5" Pearl B4514 Chrome over Brass Snare Drum
22x14" Bass Drum
Tama Octobans Low Pitch (x4)
Cowbell
Wood Blocks
Cymbals – Paiste
13" Formula 602 Medium Hi-Hats
16" 2002 Crash
8" 2002 Bell
7.5 Ufip Ictus Bell
8" 2002 Splash (x2)
11" 2002 Splash
14" (or 16") Rude Crash/Ride
16" (or 18") Rude Crash/Ride
18" 2002 Medium
24" Rude Ride/Crash
20" 2002 China
Simmons (x2) Pads (to his left)
Assorted Percussion
Stewart also used Calato Regal Tip Rock Wood Tipped Drumsticks

The Police Reunion (2007–2008) tour kit
Tama Starclassic Maple Drums and Paiste Cymbals:
Drums – Custom Police Blue Sparkle Maple Wood
10x8" Tom
12x8" Tom (To the left of his snare drum)
13x9" Tom
16x16" Floor Tom
18x16" Floor Tom
20x14" Tama Gong Drum
22x18" Bass Drum
14x5" Tama SC145 Stewart Copeland Signature Snare
Tama Custom Police Blue Sparkle Octobans (x4) (custom made for Copeland)
Cymbals – Paiste
12" Prototype Micro Hi-Hats
16" Signature Full Crash
17" Signature Fast Crash
18" Signature Fast Crash
18" Signature Full Crash
18" 2002 Flat Ride (prototype)
22" Signature Blue Bell Ride
10" Signature Splash
8" Signature Bell
8" Signature Prototype Splash
Assorted percussion
Stewart also uses his own Vater Stewart Copeland Standard Sticks.

Discography

Studio albums
 1980: Klark Kent: Music Madness from the Kinetic Kid (as Klark Kent)
 1983: Rumble Fish (Original Motion Picture Soundtrack)
 1985: The Rhythmatist
 1986: Wall Street / Salvador (Original Motion Picture Soundtracks)
 1988: The Equalizer and Other Cliff Hangers
 1990: Noah's Ark (Audiobook, with James Earl Jones)
 1994: Silent Fall Motion Picture Soundtrack
 1994: Rapa Nui (Original Motion Picture Soundtrack)
 1995: Kollected Works (as Klark Kent)
 1996: The Leopard Son
 1997: Four Days In September (Music From The Miramax Motion Picture)
 1998: Little Boy Blue
 1999: Simpatico (Music From The Motion Picture)
 2004: Orchestralli (Live album)
 2004: La Notte della Taranta
 2007: The Stewart Copeland Anthology (Compilation)
 2009: Music From Ben Hur Live
 2010: Dead Like Me (Original MGM Television Soundtrack)
 2022: Spyro

Curved Air 
 1975 : Midnight Wire
 1976 : Airborne

The Police 
Outlandos d'Amour (1978)
Reggatta de Blanc (1979)
Zenyatta Mondatta (1980)
Ghost in the Machine (1981)
Synchronicity (1983)

Collaborations 
 1977 : Strontium 90: Police Academy by Strontium 90
 1982 : Acting Very Strange by  Mike Rutherford 
 1986 : So by Peter Gabriel
 1989 : Mr. Doubles by Moon on the Water
 1989 : Animal Logic by Animal Logic
 1991 : Animal Logic II by Animal Logic 
 2001 : The Grand Pecking Order by Oysterhead
 2005 : Crossing Times And Continents by Eberhard Schoener & Friends - With Sting and Andy Summers
 2017 : Gizmodrome by Gizmodrome
 2021 : Divine Tides by Ricky Kej

Film scores

TV series

Video games

See also 

 List of drummers
 Membranophone (list of drums)

References

External links

 Copeland's official site

1952 births
Living people
A&M Records artists
American expatriates in Egypt
American expatriates in Lebanon
American expatriates in England
American film score composers
American male film score composers
American people of Scottish descent
American rock drummers
The Police members
Curved Air members
People educated at Millfield
Musicians from Alexandria, Virginia
Musicians from Beirut
Video game composers
Grammy Award winners
United States International University alumni
Chevaliers of the Ordre des Arts et des Lettres
20th-century American drummers
American male drummers
Copeland family
Oysterhead members
Gizmodrome members
Strontium 90 (band) members